The General George G. Meade School is an historic elementary/middle school which is located in the North Central neighborhood of Philadelphia, Pennsylvania. 

Part of the School District of Philadelphia, it was added to the National Register of Historic Places in 1986, and is a contributing property to the Lower North Philadelphia Speculative Housing Historic District.

History and architectural features
Designed by Irwin T. Catharine, the General George G. Meade School was built in 1936. It is a three-story, eleven-bay, yellow, brick building, which was created in a Moderne-style. It also has a four-story, five-bay addition, which features rounded corners, ribbon bands of windows and low relief Greek figures. 

It was named for General George Meade (1815–1872).

The building was added to the National Register of Historic Places in 1986. It is a contributing property to the Lower North Philadelphia Speculative Housing Historic District.

References

External links

School buildings on the National Register of Historic Places in Philadelphia
Moderne architecture in Pennsylvania
School buildings completed in 1936
Historic district contributing properties in Pennsylvania
North Central, Philadelphia
Public K–8 schools in Philadelphia
School District of Philadelphia